Serafino is an Italian given name. It may refer to:

People
 Serafino de Montegranaro (1540–1604), Italian Capuchin friar
 Serafino de' Serafini (1323-1393), Italian painter
 Serafino Belfanti (1860–1939), Italian immunologist
 Serafino Biagioni (1920–1983), Italian bicycle racer
 Serafino Brizzi (1684–1724), Italian engraver
 Serafino Cretoni (1833–1909), Italian Cardinal of the Roman Catholic Church
 Serafino De Tivoli (1826–1892), Italian artist of the Macchiaioli group
 Serafino dell'Aquila (1466–1500), Italian poet and improvisatore
 Serafino Dubois (1817–1899), Italian chess player
 Serafino Ghizzoni (born 1954), former Italian international rugby union footballer
 Serafino Mazzolini (1890–1945), Italian lawyer, politician and journalist
 Serafino Mazzarochi (1890–1961), Italian gymnast who competed in the 1912 Summer Olympics
 Serafino Porrecta (1536–1614), Italian-Dominican theologian
 Serafino Vannutelli (1834–1915), Italian Cardinal

Other uses
 Serafino (film), a 1968 Franco-Italian film by Pietro Germi
 Serafino (comics), a vagabond character in Italian comics

See also
 San Serafino Church, Montegranaro, Italy